Lebreton, Le Breton, or LeBreton is a surname. Notable people with the surname include:

 Gilles Lebreton (born 1958), French jurist and politician
 Alexis le Breton (born 1985), South African cricketer
 André le Breton (1708–1779), French publisher
 Anna Letitia Le Breton (1808–1886), English author and memoirist
 Auguste Le Breton (1913–1999), French crime novelist
 Flora Le Breton (1899–1951), English silent film actress
 George LeBreton (1810–1844), pioneer politician in the Oregon Country
 Guillaume Le Breton, French dramatist of the sixteenth century
 Hervey le Breton (died 1131), Breton cleric who became Bishop of Bangor in Wales and later Bishop of Ely in England 
 Jean-Pierre Lebreton (born 1949), scientist at ESA, and the Huygens Project Scientist and Mission Manager
 Julie Le Breton, French Canadian actress 
 Ken Le Breton (1924–1951), international speedway rider
 Louis Le Breton (1818–1866), French painter who specialised in marine paintings
 Marietta LeBreton, Louisiana historian
 Marjory LeBreton (born 1940), Leader of the Government in the Canadian Senate
 Patrick Lebreton (born 1963), member of the National Assembly of France
 Paul Lebreton (1870–1956), French tennis player
 Pierre-Montan Berton (1727–1780), called Le Breton, French composer and conductor
 Richard le Breton (fl. 1170), one of the four knights who murdered Saint Thomas Becket

And rarely a given name:
 LeBreton Dorgenois, mayor of New Orleans

Other:
 18100 Lebreton, a main-belt asteroid
 LeBreton Flats, a neighbourhood of Ottawa, Canada
 Lebreton Station